Memecylon idukkianum is a species of small tree endemic to the Western Ghats. The species was identified during a 3 year plant survey in Mathikettan Shola National Park, where it was found in eight locations.

Description
Branchlets are quadrangularm, and leaves have an acute or obtuse apex. Petioles are 5–9 mm long. Flowers are arranged in 15-20 flowered cymes. Unlike other Memecylon species, M. idukkianum has pure white flowers.

References

idukkianum